Pseudoskepticism (also spelled as pseudoscepticism) is a philosophical or scientific position that appears to be that of skepticism or scientific skepticism but in reality is a form of dogmatism.

Nineteenth and early twentieth centuries
An early use of the word was in self-denigration: on 31 August 1869, Swiss philosopher Henri-Frédéric Amiel wrote in his diary:

It soon acquired its usual meaning where a claimed skeptic is accused of excessive sureness in turning initial doubts into certainties. In 1908 Henry Louis Mencken wrote on Friedrich Nietzsche's criticism of philosopher David Strauss that:

Professor of Philosophy at the University of Illinois, Frederick L. Will used the term "pseudo-skepticism" in 1942. Alasdair MacIntyre writes:

Notre Dame Professor of English, John E. Sitter used the term in 1977 in a discussion of Alexander Pope: "Pope's intent, I believe, is to chasten the reader's skepticism — the pseudo-skepticism of the overly confident 'you' ... "

Truzzi
In 1987, Marcello Truzzi revived the term specifically for arguments which use scientific-sounding language to disparage or refute given beliefs, theories, or claims, but which in fact fail to follow the precepts of conventional scientific skepticism. He argued that scientific skepticism is agnostic to new ideas, making no claims about them but waiting for them to satisfy a burden of proof before granting them validity. Pseudoskepticism, by contrast, involves "negative hypotheses"—theoretical assertions that some belief, theory, or claim is factually wrong—without satisfying the burden of proof that such negative theoretical assertions would require.

In 1987, while working as a professor of sociology at Eastern Michigan University, Truzzi gave the following description of pseudoskeptics in the journal Zetetic Scholar (which he founded):

Truzzi attributed the following characteristics to pseudoskeptics:
Denying, when only doubt has been established
Double standards in the application of criticism
The tendency to discredit rather than investigate
Presenting insufficient evidence or proof
Assuming criticism requires no burden of proof
Making unsubstantiated counter-claims
Counter-claims based on plausibility rather than empirical evidence
Suggesting that unconvincing evidence provides grounds for completely dismissing a claim

He characterized true skepticism as:
Acceptance of doubt when neither assertion nor denial has been established
No burden of proof to take an agnostic position
Agreement that the corpus of established knowledge must be based on what is proved, but recognising its incompleteness
Even-handedness in requirement for proofs, whatever their implication
Accepting that a failure of a proof in itself proves nothing
Continuing examination of the results of experiments even when flaws are found

Subsequent usage 
Susan Blackmore, who lost her initial belief in parapsychology and in 1991 became a CSICOP fellow, later described what she termed the "worst kind of pseudoskepticism":

Hugo Anthony Meynell from the Department of Religious Studies at the University of Calgary, labels the "extreme position that all significant evidence supporting paranormal phenomena is a result of deception or lies" as pseudoskepticism.

While Truzzi's characterization was aimed at the holders of majority views whom he considered were excessively impatient of minority opinions, the term has been used to describe advocates of minority intellectual positions who engage in pseudoskeptical behavior when they characterize themselves as "skeptics" despite cherry picking evidence that conforms to a preexisting belief. Thus according to Richard Cameron Wilson, some advocates of AIDS denial are indulging in "bogus scepticism" when they argue in this way. Wilson argues that the characteristic feature of false skepticism is that it "centres not on an impartial search for the truth, but on the defence of a preconceived ideological position".

See also 
 Agnosticism
 Argument from ignorance
 Debunker
 Denialism
 Climate change denial
 Moon landing denial
 Pseudoscience
 Pseudorationalism
 Scientism

Notes and references 

Philosophy of science
Pseudoscience
Skepticism
Scientific method